Brett Tucker (born 4 April 1979) is a South African cricketer. He played in 24 first-class and 23 List A matches between 1998 and 2003. In September 2002, Tucker set a new record for the highest score whilst carrying his bat in a first-class cricket match in South Africa, with 182 not out.

See also
 List of Eastern Province representative cricketers

References

External links
 

1979 births
Living people
South African cricketers
Eastern Province cricketers
Griqualand West cricketers
Cricketers from Johannesburg